Rocha Chimera is a Kenyan writer. He received the Noma Award in 2000 for Ufundishaji wa Fasihi: Nadharia na Mbinu.  Chimera holds a B.Ed. and M.A. from Kenyatta University, and a Ph.D. from Ohio University.  He is Professor of Swahili and former chair of the Dept. of Languages and Linguistics at Egerton University. Currently, he is the Dean, School of Humanities and Social Sciences at Pwani University college, Kilifi Kenya.

His published works include Kiswahili: Past, Present and Future Horizons and Ufundishaji wa Fasihi: Nadharia na Mbinu (co-authored with Kimani Njogu) and a play Mnara wawaka moto!: uhalifu .

References

Kenyan writers
Year of birth missing (living people)
Ohio University alumni
Living people
Kenyatta University alumni
Swahili-language writers